The McDades are a Canadian folk band made up of siblings Shannon Johnson (violin and vocals), Solon McDade (bass and vocals), and Jeremiah McDade (multi-instrumentalist and vocals).

The McDades were performers at an early age, playing folk music with their parents, Terry and Danielle McDade, in the McDade Family Band from 1974–1994. The siblings performed at the  Canadian National Exhibition, the Commonwealth Games, and for the British Royal Family. They formed the McDades in 2000.

In 2012 they were the subject of the documentary The McDades - Brother Brother Sister Making Music.

Discography
 The Empress (Free Radio Records, Nov 12, 2021)
 Bloom (Free Radio, 2006) – 2007 Juno Award Winner - Best Roots/Traditional Album (group), 2007 Independent Music Award Winner - Best World Album Traditional, two time Canadian Folk Music Award Winners Best World Group & Best Instrumental Group)
 For Reel (Free Radio, 2002)

With Terry McDade
 Harpe Danse (Free Radio, 1998)
 Midwinter (Free Radio, 2003)
 Noel (Free Radio, 2004)
 Winter Rose (Free Radio, 2011)

With Maria Dunn
 From Where I Stand
 For a Song
 We Were Good People
 The Peddler

References

External links
 The McDades official website

Musical groups established in 2000
Musical groups from Edmonton
Canadian folk music groups
Independent Music Awards winners
Juno Award for Roots & Traditional Album of the Year – Group winners
Canadian Celtic music groups
2000 establishments in Alberta
Canadian Folk Music Award winners